Lynnette Teresa Brooky (born 25 January 1968) is a New Zealand professional golfer. She turned professional in 1994 and has spent her career playing mainly on the Ladies European Tour (LET). She has won four LET tournaments including back to back French Opens, one Telia Tour event in Sweden and a further four in Australia. Her best finish on the LET Order of Merit through 2005 was fifth in 2003. She represented New Zealand in the 2005 and 2007 Women's World Cup of Golf. With career earnings now approaching €1 million, she has placed in the top-20 seven times on the LET Order of Merit and has also amassed a further 56 top-10 finishes worldwide.

Personal life
Brooky has of late become more involved in a specialist teaching career following her marriage to English PGA Golf Professional Ian Godleman. EGTF qualified, she teaches at  Titahi Bay Golf Club while also teaching at various locations worldwide including Greece, Mauritius, South Africa and her native New Zealand where she has been the No.1 and most established Lady Touring Professional over a 15-year period. Brooky's teaching has seen her set up and become director of her very own golf consultancy and travel company called Pro Golfing Tours LTD.

Amateur wins
1992 New Zealand Strokeplay Championship 
1993 NSW 72 Hole Strokeplay Championship, New Zealand Amateur Matchplay Championship, Australian Women's Amateur Stroke Play Championship

Professional wins (9)

Ladies European Tour wins (4)
1998 Chrysler Ladies Austrian Open
2002 Arras Open de France Dames
2003 Arras Open de France Dames
2006 Open De España Femenino

ALPG Tour wins (4)
2003/04 Mollymook Women's Classic
2004/05 Peugeot Australian Rotarians ALPG Charity Classic, Sapphire Coast Ladies Classic
2006/07 Aristocrat Sapphire Coast Ladies Classic

Other wins (1)
1998 Kex Ladies' Open (Telia Tour)

Team appearances
Amateur
Espirito Santo Trophy (representing New Zealand): 1992, 1994
Tasman Cup (representing New Zealand): 1991 (winners), 1993
Queen Sirikit Cup (representing New Zealand): 1993 (individual winner), 1994

Professional
World Cup (representing New Zealand): 2005, 2006, 2007

External links

New Zealand female golfers
ALPG Tour golfers
Ladies European Tour golfers
Sportspeople from Wellington City
1968 births
Living people